Eleanor Joy Dodson FRS is an Australian-born biologist who specialises in the computational modelling of protein crystallography.
She holds a chair in the Department of Chemistry at the University of York.
She is the widow of the scientist Guy Dodson.

Early life and education
She was born Eleanor MacPherson in rural Australia, the daughter of Scottish farmers. In 1958, she graduated with a degree in mathematics and philosophy from the University of Melbourne.

Personal life
She was married to fellow scientist Guy Dodson until his death in 2012.  They have four children: Vicki, Richard, Philip and Tom.

Awards
1998 Fankuchen Memorial Award of the ACA
2001 Honorary Degree of Doctor of Science, University of Uppsala
2003 Fellow of the Royal Society
2006 2nd Max Perutz ECA Prize
2010 Honorary Degree of Doctor of Science, University of St Andrews
2011 9th Ewald IUCr Prize

Works

References

Year of birth missing (living people)
Fellows of the Royal Society
Female Fellows of the Royal Society
Living people
Academics of the University of York